Hypoderris is a genus of ferns in the family Tectariaceae, according to the Pteridophyte Phylogeny Group classification of 2016 (PPG I).

Taxonomy
The genus Hypoderris was erected by Robert Brown in 1830. The type species, Hypoderris brownii, was designated later by John Smith.

A 2016 molecular phylogenetic showed Hypoderris to be in a clade containing Tectaria, sister to Triplophyllum.

Species
, the Checklist of Ferns and Lycophytes of the World recognized the following species:
Hypoderris brauniana (H.Karst.) F.G.Wang & Christenh.
Hypoderris brownii J.Sm.
Hypoderris nicotianifolia (Baker) Moran et al.

References

Tectariaceae
Fern genera